Valeriev is a Bulgarian surname. Notable people with the surname include:

Svetoslav Valeriev (born 1988), Bulgarian footballer
Tsvetomir Valeriev (born 1983), Bulgarian footballer

Bulgarian-language surnames
Patronymic surnames
Surnames from given names